The jussive (abbreviated ) is a grammatical mood of verbs for issuing orders, commanding, or exhorting (within a subjunctive framework). English verbs are not marked for this mood. The mood is similar to the cohortative mood, which typically applies to the first person by appeal to the object's duties and obligations, and the imperative, which applies to the second person (by command). The jussive however typically covers the first and third persons. It can also apply to orders by their author's wish in the mandative subjunctive, as in the English, "The bank insists that she repay her debt."

Examples

German
It is typical of formal documents or religious texts, such as the Bible. Because it was more common in past centuries, it has often survived in proverbs:

It is still common that recipes are written in jussive mood:

Apart from that, jussive mood is still quite common in contemporary German. However, the pronouns he, she, and it might not be used directly; otherwise jussive would be mistaken for a dated form of courteous imperative. Instead, they will have to be replaced by "who", "someone", "everyone", "the new colleague" and so on:

Finally, an example for jussive that would have served as a courteous imperative when addressing people of lower, but not lowest, rank:

Note that  is written in capital letters here. Even if this construction is not used anymore in common German, it will be recognized as being an imperative (German Wikipedia lists the example  as a historic form of an imperative).

Latin
In the Latin language, the present subjunctive can convey jussive meaning in the third person (jussive subjunctive or ):
  ("Let him help.")
  ("Let them come.")

A jussive use of the present subjunctive is also attested for the second person in sayings and poetry, as well as in early Latin.
  ("Leave behind [...] the wrongs of Fortune", saying from Cicero's )
  ("Show us the way", poetry from Virgil's Aeneid)

Russian
The jussive mood in modern Russian serves as an imperative (for issuing orders, commanding or requesting), but covers third person instead of second person. It is always formed with a particle , which is derived from the verb  (to let, to allow).

 Imperative:  (Run!)
 Jussive:  (similar to Let him run)

Finnish
While there is a separate imperative form in Finnish, the jussive mood is used for the third person, where the imperative is not suitable. The jussive can be used to express speakers' positions or opinions that somebody is allowed to do something or that somebody is expected to do something. 
  ("Let-he/she/it-live", Hooray!)
  ("person-is-declared-to-obey", typical expression in legislative context)
  ("Let-it-happen your-will", let thy will be done)

Esperanto
The jussive mood can be expressed in Esperanto using the volitive verb form, which is made by adding -u to a verb stem.
  (Go!)
  (I asked him to come.)
  (Let him speak.)
  (Let's go.)
  (May my daughter be beautiful!)

Arabic
Classical and Standard Arabic verbs conjugate for at least three distinct moods in the imperfect: indicative, subjunctive and jussive. In the dialects, these moods are not morphologically marked.

The jussive is used after the preposition  ('to') to express a command to a third person.

A further use of this mood is in negative commands.

Hindi 
For the non-aspectual verb forms, Hindi uses the subjunctive forms as imperatives for the formal 2nd person and the 3rd person singular and plural grammatical persons.

jussive mood - 2P formal

jussive mood - 3P singular

jussive mood - 3P plural

References

Further reading

Grammatical moods